Out of Thin Air may refer to:

 Out of Thin Air, a 2017 documentary about the Guðmundur and Geirfinnur case
 Out of Thin Air, the first episode of 2014 documentary The Mystery of Matter
 "Out of Thin Air", a song by Howard Jones from Cross That Line
 "Out of Thin Air", a song from the 1996 film Aladdin and the King of Thieves
 "Out of Thin Air", an episode of Black Scorpion
 Out of Thin Air: The Brief Wonderful Life of Network News, a 1991 memoir by Reuven Frank

See also 
 Thin Air (disambiguation)